Centro Administrativo Apologético Cristão do Brasil Futebol Clube, better known as CAAC Brasil, is a sports association in the city of Rio de Janeiro.
Founded on December 22, 2009, The club was approved by FERJ on May 23, 2017.

History
In June 2009, at Rua dos Invalides, 120, room 201, in downtown Rio de Janeiro, the Copa CAAC Brasil 2009 Sports Project was created. The denomination derives from the Christian Apologetic Administrative Center of Brazil, a non-profit institution of an administrative, social and spiritual nature that aims to legalize and structure churches in the state. After the end of the competition, the club was created and affiliated to FFERJ and CBF on January 6, 2010.

The team starts to compete in the championships of basic category in the Amateur of the Capital of the Federation and finally joins the professional staff of the entity on May 23, 2017. The following year debuts in the State Championship of The C Series of Rio de Janeiro, the Fourth Division.

The club goes through several training centers such as Bom Pastor, Belford Roxo, Coqueiros Futebol Clube, São João de Meriti, Aterro do Flamengo, Colégio Futebol Clube and is currently based at Sport Club Anchieta.

In 2018, the club competes in its first professional competition, the Campeonato Carioca da Série B2 2018. Its first professional game was in August 2018, losing 1–0 to Canto do Rio.

Titles
 Amateur Runner-up of the Capital, u-17 - 2014;
 Amateur Runner-up of the Capital, u-17 - 2015;
 State League Champion, under-17 - 2015;
 Runner-up of the Capital Amateur Cup, u-16 - 2016;
 Amateur Runner-up of the Capital, u-17, 2017;

References

Sports organisations of Brazil